Olympic Steamship Company was founded in Seattle, Washington on August 22, 1925 by John Ambler, Charles A. Wallace and William W. Shorthill. Olympic Steamship Company had routes that served the Pacific Northwest.  Olympic Steamship Company had a fleet of about 4 ships. Olympic Steamship Company was named after Olympic Mountains in the state of Washington.  John Ambler was an attorney, and Charles A. Wallace previously worked at Fisher Flouring Mills Company. William W. Shorthill was a clerk at Pacific Steamship Company. After the start of the company Joseph L. Carman, Jr., became the vice president. Carman previously was president of Alaska Washington Airways. Olympic Steamship Company's first ship was an acquired 5,335-ton tanker, named the SS Dayton. Olympic Steamship Company renamed the Dayton, the SS Olympic.  SS Olympic was built in 1907 as the Harport in South Shields, England. In 1936 Olympic Steamship Company went into a joint venture with James Griffiths & Sons, Inc., as the Consolidated Olympic Company. Consolidated Olympic Company offered a Long Beach, California, Seattle, Tacoma, Washington route on the Consolidated Olympic Line.  The Consolidated Olympic Line was later renamed the Olympic-Griffiths Line. The Olympic-Griffiths Line acquired the 7,216-ton cargo ship SS Olympic Pioneer, which was used on Pacific Northwest lumber and newsprint routes. SS Olympic Pioneer also did two long voyages on world wide trade route. The SS Olympic Pioneer then moved to a routed from Puget Sound to Japan moving US Army supplies. Olympic-Griffiths Line chartered ships for the other routes on the line.  Ernest Clayton became president of the firm in 1940. Ernest Clayton previously worked for the Mccormick Steamship Company. Olympic Steamship Company was active in supporting the World War II effort.

Salmon Terminals
Salmon Terminals was founded in 1929 as a cooperative warehouse that canned and labeled salmon. The Puckett Company, founded by Jim and Roy Puckett in 1915, provided the labeling for the canned salmon in Puget Sound many canneries. In 1929, 17 Alaska’s canneries founded the Salmon Terminals cooperative in the Puget Sound, to unload, warehouse, can, label, and distribute canned salmon. The Puckett Company continues to provide the labeling service to Salmon Terminals till 1973.  Salmon Terminals was sold to Olympic Steamship Company in 1966. In 1966 Salmon Terminals operated from a warehouse in West Seattle next to Pier 5. In 1983 the warehouse moved from West Seattle to Kent, WA. Olympic Steamship Company, Salmon Terminals division was sold on July 1, 1987, the new owner founded the firm, Salmon Terminals, Inc. and moved to a new headquarters in Kent.  In 2006 Salmon Terminals moved to a new warehouse outside of Auburn, Washington.  Salmon Terminals is now a general logistics, shipping, distribution, warehouse and contract packaging firm.

World War II
Olympic Steamship Company fleet of ships were used to help the World War II effort. During World War II Olympic Steamship Company operated Merchant navy ships for the United States Shipping Board. During World War II Olympic Steamship Company was active with charter shipping with the Maritime Commission and War Shipping Administration. Olympic Steamship Company operated Liberty ships and Victory ships for the merchant navy. The ship was run by its Olympic Steamship Company crew and the US Navy supplied United States Navy Armed Guards to man the deck guns and radio.

Ships

Ships:
SS Olympic, built as Harport in 1907, owned from 1925 to 1940. Sank Jan. 22, 1942.
SS Olympic Pioneer, was Liberty ship SS James A. Drain, built in 1944, owned from 1947 to 1962.
Ships operated by Olympic Steamship Company:
World War II Victory ships:
SS Knox Victory
SS Yale Victory
 Clarksburg Victory 
World War II Liberty ships:
 SS Seton Hall Victory  
 SS Carl G. Barth  
 SS Mesa Victory  
 SS Samuel L. Cobb  
Other
Trio, tanker ship
Korean War ship:
SS Ethiopia Victory
Vietnam War ship:
 SS Ocala Victory

See also

World War II United States Merchant Navy

References 

Defunct shipping companies of the United States
American companies established in 1925